Bioprocess engineering, also biochemical engineering, is a specialization of  chemical engineering or biological engineering. It deals with the design and development of equipment and processes for the manufacturing of products such as agriculture, food, feed, pharmaceuticals, nutraceuticals, chemicals, and polymers and paper from biological materials & treatment of waste water. 
Bioprocess engineering is a conglomerate of mathematics, biology and industrial design, and consists of various spectrums like the design and study of bioreactors (operational mode, instrumentation, and physical layout) to the creation of kinetic models. It also deals with studying various biotechnological processes used in industries for large scale production of biological product for optimization of yield in the end product and the quality of end product. Bioprocess engineering may include the work of mechanical, electrical, and industrial engineers to apply principles of their disciplines to processes based on using living cells or sub component of such cells.

Colleges and universities

Auburn University

University of Georgia  (Biochemical Engineering)
Michigan Technological University
McMaster University
Technical University of Munich
University of Natural Resources and Life Sciences, Vienna
Keck Graduate Institute of Applied Life Sciences (KGI Amgen Bioprocessing Center)
Kungliga Tekniska högskolan- KTH - Royal Institute of Technology (Dept. of Industrial Biotechnology)
Queensland University of Technology (QUT) 
University of Cape Town (Centre for Bioprocess Engineering Research)
SUNY-ESF (Bioprocess Engineering Program)
Université de Sherbrooke
University of British Columbia
UC Berkeley
UC Davis
Savannah Technical College
University of Illinois Urbana-Champaign (Integrated Bioprocessing Research Laboratory)
University of Iowa (Chemical and Biochemical Engineering)
University of Minnesota (Bioproducts and Biosystems Engineering)
East Carolina University
Jacob School of Biotechnology and Bioengineering, Allahabad, India
Indian Institute of Technology, Varanasi
 Indian Institute of Technology Kharagpur
Institute of Chemical Technology, Mumbai
Jadavpur University
 Universidade Federal de Itajubá (UNIFEI)
 Universiti Malaysia Kelantan (UMK)
Universidade Federal de São João del Rei-UFSJ
Federal University of Technology – Paraná
Universidade Federal do Paraná-UFPR
São Paulo State University
Universidade Federal do Pará-UFPA
University of Louvain (UCLouvain)
University of Stellenbosch
North Carolina Agricultural and Technical State University
North Carolina State University
Virginia Tech
Ege University/Turkey (Department of Bioengineering)
National University of Costa Rica
University of Brawijaya (Department of Agricultural Engineering)
University of Indonesia
University College London (Department of Biochemical Engineering)
Universiti Teknologi Malaysia
Universiti Kuala Lumpur Malaysian Institute of Chemical and Bioengineering Technology
University of Zagreb, Faculty of food technology and biotechnology, Croatia
Villanova University
Wageningen University
University College Dublin
Obafemi Awolowo University
University of Birmingham
Universidad Autónoma de Coahuila (Facultad de Ciencias Biológicas)
Silpakorn University Thailand
Universiti Malaysia Perlis (UniMAP), School of Bioprocess Engineering (SBE)
Berlin University of Technology, Chair of Bioprocess Engineering
University of Queensland
Technical University of Denmark, Department of Chemical and Biochemical Engineering, BioEng Research Centre
South Dakota School of Mines and Technology

National Institute of Applied Science and Technology Tunis (Industrial Biology Engineering Program)
Technical University Hamburg (TUHH)
Mapua University

See also

Agricultural engineering
Biochemical engineering
Bioprocess
Bioproducts
Bioproducts engineering
Biosystems engineering
Cell therapy
Downstream (bioprocess)
Food engineering
Microbiology
Physical chemistry
Unit operations
Upstream (bioprocess)
Use of biotechnology in pharmaceutical manufacturing

References

Biological engineering
Biotechnology
Chemical engineering